Kurt Hockerup (December 18, 1944 – March 29, 2010) was a Danish politician, who served as mayor of Vallensbæk Municipality from 1994 until his death, elected for Conservative People's Party.

He was elected to the municipal first time in 1966. He was in many years chairman of the municipality's technical committee, and became mayor in 1994. In 2004 he demanded that the municipality remained independent in the forthcoming local government, which the majority of voters in a referendum backed up on. Vallensbæk got a cooperation agreement with Ishøj Municipality and remained thus independent.

Kurt Hockerup died on March 29, 2010 from cardiac arrest. After his death, Henrik Rasmussen was elected as new mayor.

References

1944 births
2010 deaths
Danish municipal councillors
Mayors of places in Denmark
Conservative People's Party (Denmark) politicians